The 1930–31 Serie B was the second tournament of this competition played in Italy since its creation.

Teams
Derthona, Lucchese, Udinese and Palermo had been promoted from Prima Divisione, while Cremonese and Padova had been relegated from Serie A.

Events
Following a reform of the third division, the relegations were reduced from four to three.

Final classification

Results

Relegation tie-breaker
Played in Bologna, 12 July 1931

Lucchese were relegated to Prima Divisione.

1930-1931
2
Italy